BTR, from Bronetransportyor/Bronetransporter (/; literally "armoured transporter"), is any of a series of Soviet or post-Soviet military armoured personnel carriers.

Manufacturers

Soviet Union
 BTR-40 – Armored 4×4 truck (1950s) based on GAZ-63 four wheel drive truck.
 BTR-40P – Another name for the BRDM-1.
 BTR-40PB – Another name for the BRDM-2.
 BTR-50 – Tracked APC (1954) based on the PT-76 amphibious light tank chassis.
 BTR-60 – Eight-wheeled APC (1959).
 BTR-70 – Eight-wheeled APC (1972).
 BTR-80 – Eight-wheeled APC (1986).
 BTR-152 – Armoured 6×6 truck (1950s) based on the ZIS-151, with later variants using the ZIL-157 truck.
 BTR-D – Bronetransportyor, Desanta (literally "armored transporter of the Airborne"), stretched six-wheel transport variant of the BMD-1 airborne IFV.
 BTR-MD "Rakushka" – APC variant of the BMD-3. Planned successor for the BTR-D.

Russia
 BTR-90 – Russian eight-wheeled APC (1990s).
 BTR-T – Russian tracked infantry fighting vehicle based on the T-55 chassis (1990s).

Ukraine

 BTR-3 – Ukrainian BTR-80 variant eight-wheeled APC (2000). It is manufactured by KMDB in Ukraine. The BTR-3 is an all-new production vehicle, rather than an upgrade of the existing in-service vehicle, such as the BTR-80.
 BTR-4 – Another Ukrainian eight-wheeled APC (2006) with rear doors designed in Ukraine by the Kharkiv Morozov Machine Building Design Bureau (SOE KMDB) as a private venture. The prototype was unveiled at the Aviasvit 2006 exhibition held in Ukraine in June 2006.
 BTR-7 – an upgrade of the BTR-70.
 BTR-94 – Ukrainian modification of the Soviet eight-wheeled BTR-80.

Notes

Armoured personnel carriers of the Soviet Union
Armoured personnel carriers of the Cold War
Cold War armoured fighting vehicles of the Soviet Union
GAZ Group military vehicles
Reconnaissance vehicles
Off-road vehicles